The Turn in the Road is a 1919 American silent drama film directed by King Vidor. His first feature film, the production was financed by the Brentwood Film Corporation and the title and the scenario based on a Christian Science religious tract. No print of this film is known to exist, which suggests that it is a lost film.

Plot
As described in a film magazine, Paul Perry (Hughes), the son of wealthy iron manufacturer Hamilton Perry (Nichols), openly loves the younger daughter of Reverend Matthew Barker (Hall), while the older daughter, who is more practical, secretly loves him. The young couple get married, and a child is born a year later but the mother dies. Almost insane with grief, the husband reproaches the clergyman for having preached a doctrine of a God who inflicts His children with sorrow. Unable to reconcile himself with his sorrow, he leaves for the slums of Chicago and searches for the truth in connection with the purpose of God. Meanwhile, his son Bob (Alexander) is cared for by the wife's sister. Paul decides to leave Chicago on a freight train, and returns to his home town and spends the night in his father's barn. The next morning Bob, who has spent the night with his grandfather, goes out to the barn to feed some puppies and discovers the sleeping man in the hay. They talk, and Paul's sister-in-law comes to the barn and recognizes him, while Paul discovers that the child is his, resolving his quest for spiritual understanding. There is also a subplot involving a feud between the wealthy iron manufacturer and his workers.

Cast
 George Nichols as Hamilton Perry
 Lloyd Hughes as Paul Perry
 Winter Hall as Reverend Matthew Barker
 Helen Jerome Eddy as Jane Barker
 Pauline Curley as Evelyn Barker
 Ben Alexander as Bob
 Charles Arling

Production
In 1918 Vidor sought financing for a feature film, his first, from several physicians and dentists incorporated as "Brentwood Films". The group had funded a series of films produced by Judge Willis Brown of the Boy City Film Company in 1918. Vidor had directed ten of these two-reelers.

King Vidor describe how he broke into feature film directing in 1918:

Due to budgetary constraints, Vidor made only a single print of the picture. Nonetheless, its “record-breaking run” at a Los Angeles theater drew the attention of Robertson-Cole, which purchased it for national release through Exhibitors Mutual. Impressed with the picture’s success, Brentwood Film Corporation (from the name of a Brentwood country club) financed three more features with Vidor as director: Better Times, The Other Half, and Poor Relations, all released in 1919.

The Christian Science ideals that Vidor presented in The Turn in the Road suggest his financial backers at Brentwood were at least sympathetic to its precepts.

Theme
The scenario and title for the film is based on a religious tract published by Christian Scientists of whom Vidor was a lifelong adherent. Vidor's religious idealism praised the power of mind over matter and Jeffersonian Agrarianism.

Film historian John Baxter cites a contemporary review by The New York Times describing a “particularly powerful” scene contrasting the response of “a child, and a rich, powerful man” to the fury of a thunderstorm: the child reacts with curiosity and wonder at the “natural force”; the man winces at each lightning flash and peal of thunder, daunted by an element that his “money and [social] power cannot overcome.” 

Film historians Raymond Durgnat and Scott Simmons report that no print of the film has been discovered by archivists: Of all of Vidor’s features, the loss of his first… is most to be regretted. From all reports it was dramatically successful and heartfelt…”

Footnotes

References
Baxter, John. 1976. King Vidor. Simon & Schuster, Inc. Monarch Film Studies. LOC Card Number 75-23544.
Brownlow, Kevin and Kobal, John. 1979. Hollywood: The Pioneers. Alfred A. Knopf Inc. A Borzoi Book, New York. 
Callahan, Dan. 2007. King Vidor. Senses of Cinema. February 2007. http://sensesofcinema.com/2007/great-directors/vidor/ Retrieved 30 May 2020.
Durgnat, Raymond and Simmon, Scott. 1988. King Vidor, American. University of California Press, Berkeley. 
Gallagher, Tag.  2007. American Triptych: Vidor, Hawks and Ford. Senses of Cinema. February, 2007 http://sensesofcinema.com/2007/the-moral-of-the-auteur-theory/vidor-hawks-ford/ Retrieved 30 May 2020.
Thompson, David  2011. The Man Who Would Be King. Directors Guild of America. https://www.dga.org/Craft/DGAQ/All-Articles/1004-Winter-2010-11/Interview-King-Vidor.aspx Retrieved 30 May 2020.

External links

1919 films
1919 drama films
Silent American drama films
American silent feature films
American black-and-white films
Films directed by King Vidor
1910s American films